Diede de Groot defeated the defending champion Yui Kamiji in the final, 6–3, 6–7(4–7), 7–6(10–4) to win the women's singles wheelchair tennis title at the 2021 Australian Open. It was the first step in an eventual Super Slam for de Groot.

Seeds

Draw

Bracket

References

External links
 Drawsheet on ausopen.com

Wheelchair Women's Singles
2021 Women's Singles